Monsters Inside Me is an American television documentary series about infectious diseases. It includes first-person interviews with people and medical professionals telling their personal stories about contracting rare diseases with most of them being parasites. Interviews with contributors are shot on location across North America. Recreations are mostly filmed near hospitals and homes in New York City.

Summary
Each episode has dramatizations that show illnesses caused by an infectious disease or medical affliction. Once the agent has been identified, their life cycles and general behaviors are illustrated. Justin Peed is the narrator, and biologist Dan Riskin explains how and why each infectious agent works inside its host. Most shows start as a commonly diagnosed disease but then transform into a different life-threatening or serious disease, which will be cured most of the time at the end. Out of the 216 cases documented on the show, only 12 of those ended in the victim dying, usually from a disease with an extremely low survival rate.

The overwhelming majority of cases and their victims occur throughout the United States, but a few cases and their victims come from Canada.

The show's first two seasons focused solely on parasites and parasitic infections, but since the third season, the show has included scenarios and medical cases about general infectious diseases and medical afflictions, including those caused by viruses, bacteria, fungi, and foreign objects.

The second season premiered on Wednesday June 9, 2010 and then returned for a third season on October 5, 2012.
As of January 7, 2011, Monsters Inside Me was broadcast in Canada by Discovery Science. It also airs on Discovery in the UK, and broadcasts in different languages on various Discovery networks across the world.

The show's final episode aired on December 17, 2017.

Episodes

Series overview

Monsters Inside Me: Extra Deadly

Monsters Inside Me: Extra Deadly is a spin-off of Monsters Inside Me that airs alongside the original show. It features reruns of episodes from Seasons 6-onwards but adds extra onscreen trivia that appears when a condition, infection, or symptom is discussed. Aside from that, it also features onscreen trivia of various casual objects found in the episode, like when it was first invented. The spin-off started in 2016; the first season is composed of altered versions of all Season 6 episodes with added trivia, and would usually air before a brand new episode from Season 7 of the original show premiered. The second season, which started in 2017, is set to air altered versions of all Season 7 episodes and previously-aired episodes of Season 8 with added trivia, and will premiere before brand-new episodes of Season 8 of the original show premiere.

Season 1 (2016)

Season 2 (2017)

Season 3 (2018)

Reception 
Mike Hale of The New York Times said that "there's science amid the frightening stories" and said that the series "really grossed him out."

Anne Louise Bannon of Common Sense Media said that "parents need to know that there is a lot of gross stuff in the series and the show has good educational content except for the tips on how to protect yourself from parasites because the information is vague".

Neil Genzlinger of The New York Times wrote "Forget 'American Horror Story.' For several years now the scariest show on television has been Animal Planet's 'Monsters Inside Me,' which recreates real cases of bizarre, life-threatening infections."

Spin-off
In 2013, a UK spin-off called Bugs, Bites & Parasites premiered on Discovery Channel UK.

References

External links 
 
 

2000s American documentary television series
2009 American television series debuts
2010s American documentary television series
Animal Planet original programming
Parasites of humans
Tropical diseases